Lidstone is a hamlet on the River Glyme in Oxfordshire, about  east of Chipping Norton.

Archaeology
The trench has become filled in but will have survived as a buried feature. The barrow is the most northerly of a line of three that form a line between Lidstone and the village of Spelsbury. It is a scheduled monument. In the middle of the barrow is an Ordnance Survey triangulation station.

Manor
By 1279 there was a hide of land at Lidstone that was part of the manor of Heythrop.

Mill
Lidstone had a large watermill on the Glyme. Via a  pitwheel it drove three pairs of millstones. The mill had its own bread oven. The mill was dismantled in 1976 and its machinery taken into storage, but the large iron waterwheel was left in place.

References

Sources

Hamlets in Oxfordshire